The 1938 Wyoming Cowboys football team represented the University of Wyoming in the Mountain States Conference (MSC) during the 1938 college football season.  In its sixth and final season under head coach Willard Witte, the team compiled a 2–5–1 record (1–4–1 against MSC opponents) and was outscored by a total of 147 to 66.

Schedule

References

Wyoming
Wyoming Cowboys football seasons
Wyoming Cowboys football